Glass Soup is a surreal fiction novel written by the American writer Jonathan Carroll, first published in 2006. It tells the story of a group of people who live in Vienna. They find out that they are caught in a battle of Gods and Chaos. This fiction consists many elements of Judeo-Christian mythology and popular culture mythos. It is a blend of real and unreal, living and dead, and good and evil.

References

External links

Novels by Jonathan Carroll
2005 American novels
Tor Books books